Qianshan is a county-level city in the southwest of Anhui Province, People's Republic of China; it is under the jurisdiction of the prefecture-level city of Anqing. The government of Qianshan County is located in Meicheng Town. The well-known Wan Mountain, or Tianzhu Mountain, is located within the borders of the County.

Administrative divisions
Qianshan has jurisdiction over 11 towns and 18 townships.

Towns
Meicheng, Huangni, Yuantan, Wanghe, Yujing, Huangpu, Shuihou, Huangbai, Guanzhuang, Chashui, Tianzhushan

Townships
Youba Township, Gujing Township, Pailou Township, Doumu Township, Longtan Township, Dubu Township, Lingtou Township, Qinglou Township, Hengzhong Township, Wumiao Township, Sanmiao Township, Nishui Township, Penghe Township, Gedu Township, Longguan Township, Tafa Township, Shuigui Township, Houchong Township

Geography
Lake Xuehu, noted for its lotus plants, lies in the centre of the city. The number of plants has decreased in recent years, possibly because they provide a food source for lobsters.

Wanghe Town, hometown of Xuruoyu, is in the south of the city.

The Qian River with its noted River Beach flows through Qianshan from north to south.

Climate

History
The Two Qiaos, two sisters from the Three Kingdoms era were from Wan County, Lujiang Commandery (present-day Qianshan, Anhui).

References

 
County-level divisions of Anhui
Anqing